José Lorenzo Pesquera (August 10, 1882 – July 25, 1950) was a Resident Commissioner of Puerto Rico.

Early life 
Born in Bayamón, Puerto Rico, Pesquera was graduated from Provincial Institute of Puerto Rico in 1897.
He attended the Keystone State Normal School in Kutztown, Pennsylvania.  in 1901 and 1902.
He was graduated from the law department of West Virginia University at Morgantown in 1904.
He was admitted to the bar the same year and commenced practice in Puerto Rico.
He also engaged in agricultural pursuits and dairying.
He served as member of the Puerto Rico House of Representatives 1917–1920.
He served as director and president of the Agricultural Association of Puerto Rico.
He was appointed as a Nonpartisan a Resident Commissioner to the United States to fill the vacancy caused by the resignation of Félix Córdova Dávila and served from April 15, 1932, until March 3, 1933.
He was not a candidate for election in 1932.
He returned to his law practice and agricultural interests.
He died in Bayamón, Puerto Rico, July 25, 1950, and was interred in Braulio Dueño Colón Municipal Cemetery in Bayamón, Puerto Rico.

See also 

 List of Hispanic Americans in the United States Congress

Sources 

1882 births
1950 deaths
People from Bayamón, Puerto Rico
Puerto Rican people of Spanish descent
Resident Commissioners of Puerto Rico
Members of the House of Representatives of Puerto Rico
West Virginia University College of Law alumni
20th-century Puerto Rican lawyers
20th-century American politicians
Independent members of the United States House of Representatives
Republican Party members of the United States House of Representatives
Independent Republican members of the United States House of Representatives